Chervoniy Gіrnik is a Kryvyi Rih municipal newspaper, published since from December 7, 1924 in Ukrainian. Edition appeared in Soviet times, survived a difficult adjustment period and the first years of Ukraine's independence, and now occupies a worthy place among print media of Kryvyi Rih. The newspaper covers the life of the city in its various dimensions: society, city life, news, sports, culture, prominent personalities of the city and more. The publication is twice a week - on Tuesday (reduced output volume 8 columns) and Thursday (complete edition - 32 pages).

Notes

External link

1924 establishments in Ukraine
Daily newspapers published in Ukraine
Newspapers established in 1924
Ukrainian-language newspapers